RailUSA is an American holding company that owns two railroads in Florida.

History
RailUSA was founded in October 2018 by private equity firm Equity Group Investments purchasing Grenada Railroad from Iowa Pacific followed in 2019 by the Florida Gulf & Atlantic Railroad from CSX. In April 2022, RailUSA was purchased by Macquarie Infrastructure Partners.

References

United States railroad holding companies
Companies based in Boca Raton, Florida
American companies established in 2018
Railway companies established in 2018
2018 establishments in Florida
2021 mergers and acquisitions
Private equity portfolio companies
Privately held companies based in Florida